The Miller was a brass era automobile built in Detroit, Michigan by the Miller Car Company from 1912 to 1913.

History 
The Miller Car Company was established in the Detroit Excelsior Works in 1911. Guy Sintz was factory manager. The Miller was built as roadsters and five-seat tourers that were powered by 30 hp and 40 hp four-cylinder Wisconsin engines.  The  vehicles were priced at $1,250 and $1,450, .  In 1912 a 1,000-lb delivery wagon was added.

The company ran out of money in 1913 and the Kosmath Company purchased the factory. The Miller automobile design and Guy Sintz went to Pittsburgh where it was refined into the Pennsy automobile.

References

 

Defunct motor vehicle manufacturers of the United States
Motor vehicle manufacturers based in Michigan
Defunct manufacturing companies based in Michigan
Brass Era vehicles
1910s cars
Cars introduced in 1911
Vehicle manufacturing companies established in 1911
Vehicle manufacturing companies disestablished in 1913